The Stour Valley Railway is a partially closed railway line that ran between , near Cambridge and  in Essex, England.  The line opened in sections between 1849 and 1865.  The route from Shelford to Sudbury closed on 6 March 1967 leaving only the section from Sudbury to Marks Tey, known as the Gainsborough Line, in operation.

History
Following acts of Parliament in 1846 and 1847 the Colchester, Stour Valley, Sudbury & Halstead Railway was authorised to construct a line from Marks Tey to Sudbury and then extend from Sudbury to Clare, with a branch line to Bury St. Edmunds forking off at Long Melford. Before construction was completed the company had changed hands twice and became part of the Eastern Union Railway.

The Marks Tey to Sudbury section of the line opened on 2 July 1849 and ran for 5 years before being taken over by the Eastern Counties Railway on 7 August 1862.

In 1862 the Eastern Union Railway and Eastern Counties Railway were amalgamated into the new Great Eastern Railway.

The Long Melford-Bury St Edmunds branch line from Melford to Bury St. Edmunds was also completed in the same year.

The closure of the line in 1967 under the Beeching Axe was the subject of a protracted battle and a proposal, led by Haverhill Urban District Council, that local authorities subsidise the line.

The remaining operational section of the line is now known as the Gainsborough Line.

Traffic

Passenger
There were four trains each way on weekdays between Marks Tey and Sudbury in 1850, one of which went to Colchester.  When services started between Cambridge and Haverhill there were three trains each way on weekdays.  By the 1890s six passenger trains ran each way on a weekday with the majority going from Cambridge or Bury St Edmunds to Marks Tey or Colchester.

In 1964 conductor guards collected fares on the trains and all stations on the line became unstaffed apart from Haverhill and Sudbury.

Before the line closed (1966–7) there were two trains a day between Sudbury and Cambridge, four between Colchester and Cambridge and six between Marks Tey or Colchester and Sudbury, with a similar number in the reverse direction.  The service was operated by primarily by Class 105 and Class 108 Diesel Multiple Units, although some services were locomotive hauled.

Freight
Coal between Peterborough and Colchester and agricultural traffic were the main freight flows on the line.

Reopening
A study in 2004 looked into the possibility of reopening the route between Cambridge to Haverhill and maybe the entire line. The campaign is now being taken up by Rail Haverhill (formerly the Cambridge to Sudbury Rail Renewal Association).

With thousands of new homes planned to be built in Haverhill in coming years, the need to improve the transport infrastructure between Haverhill and Cambridge has gained greater attention.

On 12 July 2017, Members of Parliament Matt Hancock (West Suffolk, the constituency which includes Haverhill), Heidi Allen (South Cambridgeshire) and Lucy Frazer (South East Cambridgeshire) met with Councillor James Palmer (Mayor of Cambridgeshire and Peterborough Combined Authority), other councillors and further interested parties in the House of Commons to discuss a light railway link from Cambridge to Haverhill. In a Rail Haverhill press release, Matt Hancock MP stressed that "“Haverhill would benefit hugely from a railway" and went on to say "I am pushing to bring a railway back to Haverhill. There is no doubt that better communications will bring an economic boost to the town and an improved quality of life for the residents". A feasibility study is currently underway with a report due by the end of 2017.

This line has been identified by Campaign for a Better Transport as a priority 1 candidate for reopening.

References

External links
Rail Haverhill Campaign and petition in support of the reopening of the railway between Haverhill and Cambridge.

Marks Tey–Bures–Sudbury Rail Line (1849–1990)
Reshaping the Stour Valley Line

Rail transport in Essex
Rail transport in Suffolk
Rail transport in Cambridgeshire
Closed railway lines in the East of England
Railway lines opened in 1865
Railway lines closed in 1967
Standard gauge railways in England
Rail transport in Cambridge